Chiftele, plural form of chiftea, are flat and round meatballs from Romanian traditional cuisine. Chiftele are usually made from minced pork, mixed with mashed potatoes and spices, then deep-fried. Chiftele is served with pilaf or mashed potatoes. A variant mixing rice inside the meatball is called perişoare for sour soup, making ciorbă de perişoare.

There is a recipe called chiftele de peşte (fish chiftele) consisting of fishcake made from carp.

Etymology 
The word chiftea comes from köfte, which is the Turkish word for kofta.

History 
Centuries of Ottoman presence in Romania has left some variations  from the Turkish culinary arts. Chiftele is the Romanian version of Turkish köfte.

See also 
 Kofta
 List of meatball dishes
 Mititei
 Pârjoale

Notes and references

External links 
   Chiftele's recipe
   Chiftele recipe

Romanian dishes
Meatballs